Cochylimorpha langeana is a species of moth of the family Tortricidae. It is found in Turkey, Syria, the Palestinian territories, Lebanon and Iran.

References

Moths described in 1898
Cochylimorpha
Moths of Asia